Bilal M. Ayyub (born 5 January 1958, Tulkarm, Palestine) is a researcher in risk analysis and reliability engineering. He has been a professor of civil and environmental engineering at the University of Maryland, College Park (UMD) since 1983, and is also the director of the Center for Technology and Systems Management at its  A. James Clark School of Engineering.

Biography 
Ayyub was born in Tulkarm, Palestine, on 5 January 1958 and moved to Kuwait in 1961. He was K12 schooled in Kuwait, and  earned a Bachelors of Science in Civil Engineering from Kuwait University in 1980. He received both  a Masters of Science in Civil Engineering (1981) and a Doctorate of Philosophy (1983) from  the Georgia Institute of Technology.

Career 
He works in the areas of risk analysis, uncertainty modeling, decision analysis, and systems engineering. His specialty is  risk and uncertainty analysis for decision and policy making.

Ayyub is a fellow of the American Society of Civil Engineers (ASCE), the American Society of Mechanical Engineers (ASME), the Society for Risk Analysis (SRA) and the Society of Naval Architects and Marine Engineers (SNAME).

Ayyub is also president of BMA Engineering, Inc., a Bethesda, Maryland-based engineering consulting firm that works with infrastructure and defense systems.

Publications 
Ayyub is the founding editor-in-chief of the ASCE-ASME Journal of Risk and Uncertainty in Engineering Systems in its two parts: Part A. Civil Engineering and Part B. Mechanical Engineering.
He is also on the editorial board of the Journal of Risk Analysis and the Journal of Ship Research of the SNAME. He is the author or co-author of more than 600 publications in journals and conference proceedings, and reports. He is author,  editor, co-author, or co-editor    of 20  books, including:
 Sea Level Rise and Coastal Infrastructure: Prediction, Risks and Solutions, ASCE, Reston, VA, 2011 (edited with Kearney).
 Vulnerability, Uncertainty, and Risk: Analysis, Modeling, and Management, ASCE, Reston, VA, 2011 (editor).
 Uncertainty Modeling and Analysis for Engineers and Scientists, Chapman & Hall/CRC, Press Boca Raton, Florida, 2006 (with Klir).
 Risk Analysis in Engineering and Economics, First Edition (2003), Second Edition (2014), Chapman and Hall/CRC Press, 2014.
 Elicitation of Expert Opinions for Uncertainty and Risks, CRC Press, 2002.

Notes

Living people
American civil engineers
Georgia Tech alumni
People from Tulkarm
University of Maryland, College Park faculty
1958 births